Cystiscus is a taxonomic genus of minute sea snails, marine gastropod mollusks or micromollusks.

This genus was placed in the family Cystiscidae by Coovert and Coovert, 1995. Previously the genus was in the family Marginellidae, where it is still placed by many other malacologists.

Diagnosis 
Shell minute to small, white, hyaline; spire immersed to low; lip thickened, smooth or weakly denticulate; external varix absent; siphonal notch absent; posterior notch absent; lacking collabral parietal callus ridge; columella multiplicate, with combined usually 2 to 8 plications plus parietal lirae, first plication usually strong and raised. Mantle smooth, at least partially extending over external shell surface.

Shell description 
Shell minute to small (adult length ). Color white, hyaline; surface smooth, glossy. Shape usually elliptic, obovate, or subtriangular; weakly shouldered. Spire completely immersed to low. Aperture narrow to broad, usually wider anteriorly. Lip slightly to distinctly thickened, flared posteriorly in some species, smooth on inside edge to weakly denticulate, lacking lirae, external varix absent. Shell lacking a siphonal notch and posterior notch. Shell with weak parietal callus wash or weak parietal callus deposits in some species, but lacking collabral parietal callus ridge. Columella multiplicate, with combined total 2 to 8 plications plus parietal lirae, rarely to 17 in which the posteriormost are denticles; one species with only 1 plication. Plications usually occupying less than half the length of the aperture, but most of the aperture in some. Plications excavated just inside aperture in a few species, usually evenly rounded, first plication usually raised and very strong. Shell with cystiscid internal whorls.

Animal anatomy
Internal: Unknown
External: Animal with eyes at side of head, usually on lateral swelling; mantle smooth, at least partially extending onto external shell surface, in some species nearly covering shell; foot relatively narrow, about as wide as shell length; head and mantle usually uniformly colored, often bright red, orange, or yellow, or brown, or black, internal mantle color pattern often showing through translucent shell.
Radula: Uniserial, ribbon long, narrow, composed of 80-209 plates. Rachidian plates overlapping, narrow, moderately to strong arched, with 6-14 sharp cusps on posterior edge, the central cusp usually the strongest. The anterior edge of the rachidian plate is strongly concave, resulting in U- or V-shaped plates.

Habitat 

Fossil record 
Eocene of France and Alabama, upper Oligogene and Miocene of Western Atlantic, to Recent.

Remarks 
The two halves of the head are capable of closing together at will, thus appearing unsplit. The long siphon usually distinguishes this group from Gibberula. The shell of Persicula is usually patterned, often has a distinct external varix, and the spire is usually immersed. These conchological features serve to separate the two groups.

Species 
Cystiscus contains the following accepted species:

Cystiscus angasi (Crosse, 1870)
Cystiscus aphanacme (Tomlin, 1918)
Cystiscus aurantius Boyer, 2003
Cystiscus beqae Wakefield & McCleery, 2006
Cystiscus boucheti Boyer, 2003
Cystiscus bougei (Bavay, 1917)
Cystiscus bucca (Tomlin, 1916)
Cystiscus caeruleus Boyer, 2003
Cystiscus camelopardalis Boyer, 2003
Cystiscus carinifer Wakefield & McCleery, 2005
Cystiscus connectans (May, 1911)
Cystiscus cooverti Boyer, 2003
Cystiscus cratericula (Tate & May, 1900)
Cystiscus cymbalum (Tate, 1878)
Cystiscus cystiscus (Redfield, 1870)
Cystiscus deeae Wakefield & McCleery, 2006
Cystiscus deltoides Boyer, 2003
Cystiscus flindersi (Pritchard & Gatliff, 1899)
Cystiscus freycineti  (May, 1915)
Cystiscus garretti Wakefield & McCleery, 2006
Cystiscus gorii Boyer, 2018
Cystiscus goubini  (Bavay, 1922)
Cystiscus halli  (Pritchard & Gatliff, 1899)
Cystiscus havannensis Wakefield & McCleery, 2006
Cystiscus hernandezi Boyer, 2018
Cystiscus incertus (May, 1920)
Cystiscus indiscretus (May, 1911)
Cystiscus iota (Hedley, 1899)
Cystiscus jucundus (W. Turton, 1932)
Cystiscus mainardii Cossignani, 2009
Cystiscus maloloensis Wakefield & McCleery, 2006
Cystiscus manceli (Jousseaume, 1875)
Cystiscus marshalli Boyer, 2003
Cystiscus maskelynensis Wakefield & McCleery, 2006
Cystiscus matoensis Wakefield & McCleery, 2006
Cystiscus melwardi (Laseron, 1957)
Cystiscus microgonia (Dall, 1927)
Cystiscus minor Boyer, 2003
Cystiscus minusculus Lussi & G. Smith, 1998
Cystiscus minutissimus (Tenison Woods, 1876)
Cystiscus montrouzieri (Bavay, 1922)
Cystiscus mosaica Wakefield & McCleery, 2005
Cystiscus nebulosa Wakefield & McCleery, 2005
Cystiscus obesulus  (May, 1920)
Cystiscus pardus Boyer, 2003
Cystiscus peelae Lussi & G. Smith, 1998
Cystiscus politus  (Carpenter, 1857)
Cystiscus problematicus  (Gatliff & Gabriel, 1916)
Cystiscus pseudoaurantius Boyer, 2003
Cystiscus pseustes  (E. A. Smith, 1904)
Cystiscus punctatus Boyer, 2003
Cystiscus pusillus Wakefield & McCleery, 2006
Cystiscus rendai Boyer, 2018
Cystiscus robini Boyer, 2018
Cystiscus sandwicensis (Pease, 1860)
Cystiscus subauriculatus (May, 1915)
Cystiscus thouinensis (May, 1915)
Cystiscus tomlinianus (May, 1918)
Cystiscus triangularis Cossignani, 2008
Cystiscus tricinctus Boyer, 2003
Cystiscus truncatus (Dall, 1927)
Cystiscus vavauensis Wakefield & McCleery, 2006
Cystiscus viaderi Boyer, 2004
Cystiscus vidae (Dell, 1956)
Cystiscus viridis Boyer, 2003
Cystiscus vitiensis Wakefield & McCleery, 2006
Cystiscus wakefieldi T. Cossignani, 2001
Cystiscus yasawaensis Wakefield & McCleery, 2006

References 

  2005. Classification and Nomenclator of Gastropod Families. Malacologia 47(1-2):1-397.
 Laseron, C. F. (1957). A new classification of the Australian Marginellidae (Mollusca), with a review of species from the Solanderian and Dampierian zoogeographical provinces. Australian Journal of Marine and Freshwater Research. 8(3): 274-311

External links
 Stimpson W. 1865. On certain genera and families of zoophagous gasteropods. American Journal of Conchology, 1: 55-64, pl. 8-9
 Coovert G.A. & Coovert H.K. (1995) Revision of the supraspecific classification of marginelliform gastropods. The Nautilus 109(2-3): 43-110

 
Taxa named by William Stimpson
Cystiscidae